Gemma Umberta Maria Galgani (12 March 1878 – 11 April 1903), also known as Gemma of Lucca, was an Italian mystic, venerated as a saint in the Catholic Church since 1940. She has been called the "daughter of the Passion" because of her profound imitation of the Passion of Christ. She is especially venerated in the Congregation of the Passion of Jesus (Passionists).

Early life

Gemma Umberta Maria Galgani was born on 12 March 1878, in the hamlet of Camigliano in the provincial town of Capannori. Gemma was the fifth of eight children and the first daughter; her father, Enrico Galgani, was a prosperous pharmacist.

Soon after Galgani's birth, the family relocated north from Camigliano to a large new home in the Tuscan city of Lucca in a move which was undertaken to facilitate an improvement in the children's education. Gemma's mother, Aurelia Galgani, contracted tuberculosis. Because of this hardship, Gemma was placed in a private nursery school run by Elena and Ersilia Vallini when she was two-and-a-half years old.

Several members of the Galgani family died during this period. Their firstborn child, Carlo, and Gemma's little sister Giulia died at an early age. On 17 September 1885, Aurelia Galgani died from tuberculosis, which she had suffered from for five years, and Gemma's beloved brother Gino died from the same disease while studying for the priesthood.

Education
Galgani was sent to a Catholic half-boarding school in Lucca run by the Sisters of St. Zita. She excelled in French, arithmetic, and music. At the age of nine, Galgani was allowed to receive her first communion.

Adolescence
At age 16, Galgani developed spinal meningitis, but recovered. She attributed her extraordinary cure to the Sacred Heart of Jesus through the intercession of Gabriel of Our Lady of Sorrows and Marguerite Marie Alacoque.

Shortly after turning 19, Galgani was orphaned, and thereafter she was responsible for the upbringing of her younger siblings, which she did with her aunt Carolina. She declined two marriage proposals and became a housekeeper with the Giannini family.

Mysticism

According to a biography written by her spiritual director, Germano Ruoppolo, Galgani began to display signs of the stigmata on 8 June 1899, at the age of twenty-one. She stated that she had spoken with her guardian angel, Jesus, the Virgin Mary, and other saints—especially Gabriel of Our Lady of Sorrows. According to her testimonies, she sometimes received special messages from them about current or future events. With her health in decline, Ruoppolo directed her to pray for the disappearance of her stigmata; she did so and the marks ceased. She said that she resisted the devil's attacks often.

Galgani was frequently found in a state of ecstasy. She has also been reputed to levitate: she claimed that on one occasion, when her arms were around the crucifix in her dining room and she was kissing the wound on the side of the Crucified, she found herself raised from the floor.

Stigmata
Galgani is said to have experienced stigmata on 8 June 1899, on the eve of the feast of the Sacred Heart. She wrote: {{quote|I felt an inward sorrow for my sins, but so intense that I have never felt the like again ... My will made me detest them all, and promise willingly to suffer everything as expiation for them. Then the thoughts crowded thickly within me, and they were thoughts of sorrow, love, fear, hope and comfort. In the subsequent rapture, Gemma saw her guardian angel in the company of the Blessed Virgin Mary:

The physician Pietro Pfanner, who had known Galgani since her childhood, examined her stigmata. In his opinion, those were semblance of hysterical behaviour, and he suspected Gemma may have suffered from a form of neurosis. Pfanner examined Galgani and noted spots of blood on the palms of her hands but when he ordered the blood to be wiped away with a wet towel there was no wound. He concluded the phenomenon to be self-inflicted. On another occasion by Galgani's foster mother Cecilia Giannini observed a sewing needle on the floor next to her.
The psychologist Donovan Rawcliffe claimed in a book published nearly 50 years after her death that her stigmata were caused by "self-inflicted wounds of a major hysteric."

Reception

Galgani was well known in the vicinity of Lucca before her death, especially to those in poverty. Opinions of her were divided. Some people admired her extraordinary virtues and referred to her as "the virgin of Lucca" out of pious respect and admiration. Others mocked her (including her younger sister, Angelina, who apparently used to make fun of Galgani during such experiences).

Death, canonization and veneration
In early 1903, Galgani was diagnosed with tuberculosis, and went into a long and often painful decline accompanied by several mystical phenomena. One of the religious nursing sisters who attended to her stated,  At the beginning of Holy Week 1903, her health quickly deteriorated, and by Good Friday she was suffering tremendously, dying in a small room across from the Giannini house on 11 April 1903, Holy Saturday. 

After a thorough examination of her life by the Church, Gemma Galgani was beatified on 14 May 1933 and canonized on 2 May 1940. Galgani's relics are housed at the Sanctuary of Santa Gemma associated with the Passionist monastery in Lucca, Italy. Since 1985, her heart is housed in the Santuario de Santa Gema, in Madrid, Spain. Gemma Galgani's confessor Germano Ruoppolo wrote a book about her.

The bronze figure on her tomb in Lucca was created by sculptor Francesco Nagni.

References

Notes

Bibliography

 Rudoph M. Bell; Cristina Mazzoni (2003). The Voices of Gemma Galgani: The Life and Afterlife of a Modern Saint. Chicago, IL, US: University of Chicago Press. . 
 Robert A. Orsi (2005): "Two Aspects of One Life" in Between Heaven and Earth: The Religious Worlds People Make and the Scholars Who Study Them. Princeton University Press, p. 110–145.

External links
  
 
 

1878 births
1903 deaths
20th-century Christian mystics
20th-century Christian saints
20th-century deaths from tuberculosis
Angelic visionaries
Italian anti-poverty advocates
Christian female saints of the Late Modern era
Tuberculosis deaths in Italy
Italian Christian mystics
Italian Roman Catholic saints
Canonizations by Pope Pius XII
People from the Province of Lucca
Roman Catholic mystics
Stigmatics
Infectious disease deaths in Tuscany